Thomas Andersson (born 11 December 1956) is a Swedish football manager and former player

References

External links
 

1956 births
Living people
Swedish footballers
Association football forwards
Allsvenskan players
Bundesliga players
IFK Norrköping players
Västerås SK Fotboll players
VfL Bochum players
AIK Fotboll players
Vasalunds IF players
Swedish expatriate footballers
Swedish expatriate sportspeople in Germany
Expatriate footballers in Germany
People from Katrineholm Municipality
Sportspeople from Södermanland County